Beth Wessel-Kroeschell (born 1959) is American politician. She held the District 45 seat in the Iowa House of Representatives from 2005 to 2023. During the 2022 state legislative elections, she was redistricted to District 49.

, Wessel-Kroeschell serves on several committees in the Iowa House – the Environmental Protection and Judiciary committees, as well as the Human Resources committee, where she is the ranking member.  She is also a member of the Health and Human Services Appropriations Subcommittee and of the Medical Assistance Projections and Assessment Council.

Wessel-Kroeschell was born and raised in Ames, Iowa. Outside of politics, she is the public events coordinator for Reiman Gardens.

Electoral history
*incumbent

References

External links

 Representative Beth Wessel-Kroeschell official Iowa General Assembly site
 Wessel-Kroeschell District 45 official constituency site
 
 Financial information (state office) at the National Institute for Money in State Politics

1959 births
Living people
Democratic Party members of the Iowa House of Representatives
Iowa Democrats
Women state legislators in Iowa
Politicians from Ames, Iowa
21st-century American politicians
21st-century American women politicians